Live Radio City Music Hall 2003 is a live album by American singer Luther Vandross. It was released on October 14, 2003, by J Records and recorded live at Radio City Music Hall in New York City on February 11 and 12, 2003, two months before Vandross' hospitalization due to a stroke. This concert would also be the last of Vandross' career.

Track listing

Charts

References

2003 live albums
Albums recorded at Radio City Music Hall
Albums produced by Luther Vandross
J Records live albums
Luther Vandross live albums